Chhatarpur  is an elevated station on the Yellow Line of the Delhi Metro. It is located in the Chhatarpur locality of the South West district of Delhi, India. Shree Adya Katyayani Shakti Peeth, popularly known as the Chhatarpur Temple is located near the station.

The station was to be opened in June 2010, along with the other stations of the completely elevated corridor of the Yellow Line from Qutub Minar–HUDA City Centre. However, construction on the station was delayed due to land acquisition issues. To make the station operational before the 2010 Commonwealth Games, the Delhi Metro Rail Corporation adopted a special design to construct the Chhatarpur station, using pre-fabricated structures. The station was finally opened to public on 26 August 2010, being built in a record time of nine months. Chhatarpur  is the only station in the Delhi Metro network to be made completely of steel.

History
Delhi Metro Rail Corporation Ltd. (DMRC) started to acquire land in Chattarpur area to construct the station since September 2006. A  plot was required for constructing the main Metro station, an electrical sub station, parking space and other utilities. After having land acquisition problems in acquiring three plots for construction, DMRC decided to skip the station.  But the gap between the two stations (Qutub Minar and Sultanpur) on either side of Chhatarpur would have been 2.7 km, which is too long for a MRTS system. As the station was expected to see a ridership of about 11,723 passengers daily by 2011 in Vasant Kunj area and the Chhatarpur temple, DMRC decided to construct the station using a special design costing an additional 30 to 50% expense to construct the station within the time frame. The construction work of the station was delayed as the land for the building of the station was acquired by DMRC in October 2009 after prolonged litigation. The elevated station was constructed using a unique method using special pre-fabricated/structural steel as the conventional construction technique by concrete would have taken at least 18 to 24 months. The steel structures were fabricated in a factory in Gurgaon. The quality of the construction was then checked through radiography of the joints and dye-penetration tests (DPT). To ensure quality work, the welding activity was not carried at Chhatarpur, and the steel structures had to be joined using bolting arrangements.

The Qutub Minar-Huda City Centre corridor of the Yellow Line was made operational in June 2010 with ten stations with no stoppage at the Chhatarpur station. The work on the station was completed by August 2010 and the mandatory clearance was given by R K Kardam, the Commissioner of Metro rail safety (CMRS) on 25 August 2010. The Chhatarpur station was finally opened to public on 26 August 2010, built in a record time of 9 months.

Facilities
The Chhatarpur station is an elevated station built in an area of 26,000 sq. m. The station has a receiving sub-station (RSS) built in 1 hectare area and the largest parking area in the Delhi Metro network. The parking lot has been built over about 12,000 square metres. However, only about 4,000 square metres of parking area was opened for use where 800 two wheelers and 200 cars can be parked. The rest of the parking area will be opened in a phased manner. The station caters to the localities of Chhatarpur, Mehrauli village, Kishangarh Village and Vasant Kunj area and also the huge number of devotees who visit Chhatarpur temple. The expected ridership of this station as per the detailed project report (DPR) made by the DMRC is 11,723 in 2011.

List of available automated teller machines at Chhatarpur metro station are:
RBL Bank
Canara Bank
HDFC Bank
State Bank of India

Station layout

Gallery

See also
List of Delhi Metro stations
Transport in Delhi
Delhi Metro Rail Corporation
Delhi Suburban Railway
Delhi Transport Corporation
South Delhi
Chhatarpur, Delhi (Vidhan Sabha constituency)
Chhatarpur Temple
Qutab Minar metro station
National Capital Region (India)
List of rapid transit systems
List of metro systems

References

External links

 Delhi Metro Rail Corporation Ltd. (Official site)
 Delhi Metro Annual Reports
 
 UrbanRail.Net – descriptions of all metro systems in the world, each with a schematic map showing all stations.

Delhi Metro stations
Railway stations opened in 2010
Railway stations in South Delhi district
2010 establishments in Delhi